Underground Printing is an American retail company that makes custom apparel and items.

History 

Underground Printing, first known as A-1 Screenprinting, was founded in 2001 by childhood friends Rishi Narayan and Ryan Gregg while they were undergraduates at the University of Michigan. The company would become known as Underground Printing in 2004 upon the acquisition of a company with that name. In 2006, they opened their first retail store in Ann Arbor. Since then, the U of M Alumni have grown their small business into a company with over 200 employees and 25 retail locations.

In 2019, the company was named to the Inc. 5000 list, a list noting the 5000 fastest-growing private companies in the U.S., for a ninth consecutive year.

Fundraising 

In 2018, they partnered with the Pittsburgh Steelers to produce ‘Stronger Than Hate’ shirts in the wake of the Tree of Life synagogue shooting. The t-shirts were available in Pittsburgh retail stores and proceeds from the sale of any products with the ‘Stronger Than Hate’ logo went directly to the victims of the tragedy.

During the COVID-19 pandemic, in March 2020, Underground Printing sold ‘Flatten the Curve’ t-shirts in which proceeds directly benefited local businesses in towns like Ann Arbor, MI, Madison, WI, Evanston, IL, Iowa City, IA, Morgantown, WV, Grand Rapids, MI, and New Windsor, MD.

20th Anniversary 
In 2021, UGP celebrated their 20th anniversary. Since the beginning, Underground Printing has managed to become one of the largest custom printed apparel providers in the country with more than 200 employees at 25 locations across 13 states. On average, UGP prints 10,000 T-shirts a day at its production facility.

Growth 
In May 2021, UGP moved its corporate headquarters to Ypsilanti, MI. The new production facility is three times larger than Underground Printing's previous facility, measuring at 172,000 square-feet. The new space, which can also accommodate over 1,600 employees, is a newer build, while their former location was built in the 60s. "We took a big, big step and we're really excited about it because we don't have to think about space for growth hopefully for a while now," said Narayan.

References 

2001 establishments in Michigan
Clothing companies
Companies based in Ann Arbor, Michigan